Ritchie Zanga (born 8 April 1988 in Drancy) is a French professional football player. Currently, he plays in the Championnat de France amateur for Olympique Noisy-le-Sec.

He played on the professional level in Lega Pro Seconda Divisione for A.S. Cisco Calcio Roma.

1988 births
Living people
French footballers
French expatriate footballers
Expatriate footballers in Italy
Olympique Noisy-le-Sec players
Association football forwards